Mount Moco, at , is the highest mountain in Angola. Mount Moco was named one of Angola's "seven wonders" in 2014. The mountain is a destination for birdwatchers, hikers, and people participating in rappelling and paragliding.

Flora and fauna
The mountain's Afromontane forests are part of the Angolan montane forest-grassland mosaic bioregion.

Flora
Mount Moco is largely under-researched and has been visited by very few botanical surveyors. It is known to have several species of Protea and other flowering plants, many of which appear in July through September after grassland fires have settled.

Birdlife
Mount Moco is home to many birds, with around 233 species recorded at the site. It has been designated an Important Bird Area (IBA) by BirdLife International and is part of the Western Angola Endemic Bird Area.

The mountain provides a home for a number of endangered and threatened bird species including the Swiersta's Francolin (Pternistis swierstrai), Angola Cave Chat (Xenocopsychus ansorgei), Angola Slaty Flycatcher (Dioptrornis brunneus) and Ludwig's Double-collared Sunbird (Cinnyris ludovicensis).

Conservation
Mount Moco is a particularly threatened habitat due to unsustainable wood collection for construction-based logging and for firewood. Uncontrolled bush fires are also an environmental threat. Though a Mount Moco Special Reserve has been proposed, the area currently has no protection status or measures in place.

The forest continues to be at risk from the local residents of the village of Kanjonde, which sits at the foot of Mount Moco. As they depend primarily on subsistence farming, the villagers frequently burn vegetation and fell trees to make way for food cultivation in the mountain's valleys. Kanjonde has no electricity, so the residents also depend on wood fuel for cooking.

The Mount Moco Project is a charitable foundation working to gain protection status for Mount Moco and to educate the Kanjonde villagers about more sustainable practices. The Project began a native tree nursery in July 2010 at Kanjonde, and this nursery was expanded in 2012 with permission of the village's soba (chief), Amândio Cabo.

Notes

References
 Merriam-Webster's Geographical Dictionary, Third Edition. Springfield, Massachusetts: Merriam-Webster, Incorporated, 1997. .

Mountains of Angola
Highest points of countries